The China Squash Open is an annual men's and women's squash tournament that takes place in Shanghai in China in September or October. It is part of the PSA World Tour and the WSA World Tour.

Past Results

Men's

Women's

See also
PSA World Tour
WSA World Tour

References

External links
WSA 2011 website draw
Squashsite 2011 website

Squash tournaments in China